The Metamorfosis World Tour was a worldwide concert tour by Guatemalan singer–songwriter Ricardo Arjona in support of his thirteenth studio album, Independiente. Beginning in January 2012, it was Arjona's first tour since leaving Warner Music to become an independent artist. The tour was announced in December 2011 with dates at American, Argentinian and Chilean venues, and received a positive critical response. The show was designed for a revolving stage, with Arjona performing while the scenery changed with the songs being performed. Four changes of scenery were developed: a two-floor apartment, a bar, a circus and a theatre. The number of songs played at each show varied from 19 to 23.

The tour broke several records. In Buenos Aires it was the best-attended show ever at José Amalfitani Stadium, attracting a total audience of more than 160,000. In Guatemala City, Arjona became the first artist with two consecutive sold-out concerts at the Mateo Flores Stadium. The tour was seen by more than two million people in twenty countries.  Most songs performed were from Independiente, and fellow Guatemalan singer–songwriter Gaby Moreno joined Arjona for "Fuiste Tú". The Metamorfosis World Tour followed Arjona's Quinto Piso Tour (one of the most successful tours by a Latin artist, with a total attendance of over one million in 19 countries).

Background 

Weeks before the release of Independiente, Arjona published an open letter concerning his past relationships with recording companies. He revealed the circumstances surrounding his first contract ("a producer, friend of mine, told them [the record label] that if they did not sign me in, they won't sign two artists he had [at that time]"), explaining that he received the "minimum royalty percentage" from his most successful albums. Independiente is Arjona's first independent release on his own label: Metamorfosis, a company he created to refocus his career. The company is headed by Arjona and several friends (including photographer–director Ricardo Calderón, Universal Music México executive Humberto Calderon and BMG's Miriam Sommerz), and is based in Miami and Mexico City. Arjona asserted that his independence represented compromise more than freedom: "Inside the word 'Independent', even when it sounds like extreme freedom, there's a big amount of compromise and the responsibility of being able to administrate, in the best way possible, such independence".  Billboard noted that while other groups have released independent albums following contracts with major labels, Arjona is the foremost Latin pop artist to do so. Although the album is marketed by the new label, its distribution is handled by Warner Music.

Concert synopsis

Scenography 

The show was designed for a revolving stage divided into four sets, with Arjona performing with seven musicians and a showgirl. Fifty people were needed to set up the 45-ton stage, which was transported on 17 trucks. One hundred fifty lights, (seventy of which were mobile) were used during each concert, in addition to ten tons of scenery. Each set related to the songs being performed. The first evoked a two-floor apartment with books, tables and chairs. Here Arjona sang "Lo Que Está Bien Está Mal", "Animal Nocturno", "Hay Amores", "Desnuda" and "El Amor" (during the set change). The second set represented a bar, where the singer performed "Historia de Taxi" and "Como Duele". He then interacted with the audience on "Pingüinos en La Cama"; during some concerts Arjona sang to a fan's phone, and invited an older woman onstage to accompany him on "Señora De Las Cuatro Décadas".

The third set was a circus, usually changing while Arjona performed "Reconciliación". Other songs performed on this set were "Tarde (Sin Daños a Terceros)", "Fuiste Tú" (with fellow Guatemalan singer Gaby Moreno), "Te Conozco" and "Si El Norte Fuera El Sur". The fourth set was a theatre, similar to the first. Here the singer performed "El Problema" before leaving the stage, simulating the end of the concert. After a few minutes, Arjona returned to close the show with "Minutos" and "Mujeres".

A large LCD screen was over the stage. At the beginning of the concert a fictional news program called Metamorfosis showed a series of images from Arjona's life, (while "Vida" played in the background) with images of Salvador Allende, Frida Kahlo, Donald Trump, Barack Obama and others during other songs. In Santiago de Chile, the Chilean flag and peace symbols appeared on the screen. In Buenos Aires, the Argentine flag was shown.

Music 
The number of songs played during each concert varied from 19 to 23; seven were from Independiente. Gaby Moreno appeared during every concert to perform "Fuiste Tú". The show began with a video presentation, with "Vida" from Poquita Ropa as background music. The video consisted of images (including those of a young Arjona), movies and shows. Arjona then arrived to sing "Lo Que Está Bien Está Mal", "Animal Nocturno" (from the album of the same name), "Hay Amores" and "Desnuda" (from the album Vivo). In some cities (including Buenos Aires and Santiago de Chile), Arjona performed "Acompáñame A Estar Solo" before "El Amor"; in Monterrey, "El Amor" was performed first.

At his concert in Mendoza, Arjona observed that "The day I chose this career was the day I realized that a spoken verse could earn you a slap, but a sung verse could give you sighs." He then sang "Mi Novia Se Me Está Poniendo Vieja", a song he wrote for his mother. "Dime Que No" and "Como Duele" followed; in Santiago de Chile, "Dime Que No" was replaced by "Historia de Taxi". After "Como Duele" in some shows, "Pingüinos En La Cama" was performed before "Señora De Las Cuatro Décadas". "Reconciliación" was performed next, while the set changed to a circus.

In some concerts "Fuiste Tú" was played before the set changed to a circus, before "Reconciliación". In Santiago de Chile and Buenos Aires, "Fuiste Tú" was performed after "Reconciliación" and "Tarde (Sin Daños a Terceros)"; the latter was performed after "Fuiste Tú" on most dates. "Te Conozco", "Te Quiero" and "Si El Norte Fuera El Sur" followed. Arjona then performed "El Problema" before leaving the stage, simulating the end of the concert. After a few minutes he returned, singing "Minutos" and "Mujeres" to close the show.

Reception

Critical response 

The Metamorfosis World Tour was widely praised by critics and fans. Natalie Torres, of the newspaper Dia a Dia, said that "Arjona knows how to handle his 'girls', with a mix of attitudes from a 'rough' male and seductive lyrics." Jon Pareles of The New York Times reported, "Arjona is one of Latin pop's finest lyricists: observant, nuanced, sometimes wry, sometimes melancholy and especially fond of the play of opposites...unlike some of his fellow Latin pop stars, Mr. Arjona is no saccharine lover boy."

Aracely Chantaka of the Mexican newspaper La Vanguardia said after the show in Monterrey, "Arjona's metamorphosis has been noticeable throughout the years. He's not the same young man who sang in a bar accompanied only with a guitar. Today he's surrounded by a great production." She finally stated that "essentially he's the same: the one who sings to love." The Argentine newspaper Clarín praised Arjona's rapport with his largely female audience after his two-year absence from Argentina. The appearance of Gaby Moreno for "Fuiste Tú" was also praised by critics and fans, and was considered the highlight of the show.

Records 
Between 31 March and 1 April 2012, Arjona toured Guatemala, his native country. The two concerts he presented in the Mateo Flores stadium were both sold-out performances, becoming the first artist in Guatemalan history to achieve this feat. As of 16 April 2012, his Metamorfosis World Tour has reached more than 400,000 fans, from which about 160,000 were only from his Buenos Aires tour dates on 12–15 April. On 25 April, Arjona's show on Mendoza, Argentina accumulated an attendance of 24,000 people, breaking the record set by Luis Miguel 10 years prior, and thus becoming the highest-grossing artist ever on that province. Hours before his performance on Mendoza, the Malvinas Argentinas stadium in which the concert was held, a fire burned close to one of the entries of the complex.

Set list

Additional notes 

 The order of the songs performed varied.

Tour dates

Cancellations and rescheduled shows

Attendance and box office

References 

2012 concert tours
Ricardo Arjona concert tours